Austrarchaea is a genus of Australian assassin spiders first described by Raymond Robert Forster & Norman I. Platnick in 1984. A further 25 were described by Michael Gordon Rix and Mark Stephen Harvey in 2011 and 2012.

Species
 it contains twenty-seven species:
Austrarchaea alani Rix & Harvey, 2011 – Australia (Queensland)
Austrarchaea aleenae Rix & Harvey, 2011 – Australia (Queensland)
Austrarchaea binfordae Rix & Harvey, 2011 – Australia (New South Wales)
Austrarchaea christopheri Rix & Harvey, 2011 – Australia (New South Wales)
Austrarchaea clyneae Rix & Harvey, 2011 – Australia (Queensland, New South Wales)
Austrarchaea cunninghami Rix & Harvey, 2011 – Australia (Queensland)
Austrarchaea daviesae Forster & Platnick, 1984 – Australia (Queensland)
Austrarchaea dianneae Rix & Harvey, 2011 – Australia (Queensland)
Austrarchaea griswoldi Rix & Harvey, 2012 – Australia (Queensland)
Austrarchaea harmsi Rix & Harvey, 2011 – Australia (Queensland)
Austrarchaea helenae Rix & Harvey, 2011 – Australia (New South Wales)
Austrarchaea hoskini Rix & Harvey, 2012 – Australia (Queensland)
Austrarchaea judyae Rix & Harvey, 2011 – Australia (Queensland)
Austrarchaea karenae Rix & Harvey, 2012 – Australia (Queensland)
Austrarchaea mascordi Rix & Harvey, 2011 – Australia (New South Wales)
Austrarchaea mcguiganae Rix & Harvey, 2011 – Australia (New South Wales)
Austrarchaea milledgei Rix & Harvey, 2011 – Australia (New South Wales)
Austrarchaea monteithi Rix & Harvey, 2011 – Australia (New South Wales)
Austrarchaea nodosa (Forster, 1956) (type) – Australia (Queensland, New South Wales)
Austrarchaea platnickorum Rix & Harvey, 2011 – Australia (New South Wales)
Austrarchaea raveni Rix & Harvey, 2011 – Australia (Queensland)
Austrarchaea smithae Rix & Harvey, 2011 – Australia (New South Wales)
Austrarchaea tealei Rix & Harvey, 2012 – Australia (Queensland)
Austrarchaea thompsoni Rix & Harvey, 2012 – Australia (Queensland)
Austrarchaea wallacei Rix & Harvey, 2012 – Australia (Queensland)
Austrarchaea westi Rix & Harvey, 2012 – Australia (Queensland)
Austrarchaea woodae Rix & Harvey, 2012 – Australia (Queensland)

References

Araneomorphae genera
Archaeidae
Spiders of Australia
Taxa named by Raymond Robert Forster